Kenneth Gordon Thomson (25 February 1930 – 15 June 1969) was a Scottish footballer, who played in the Football League for Hartlepools United, Middlesbrough and Stoke City. He made 278 appearances for Stoke.

Career
Born in Aberdeen, Thomson was poised to sign for Stoke in 1946 from Scottish club Banks O' Dee but he was called up for national service in the Royal Air Force. After his demob Thomson joined his home town club Aberdeen. Stoke manager Frank Taylor finally got his signature for a fee of £22,000 in September 1952. A strong and commanding defender Thomson was soon made captain by Taylor. His first season with the club, in 1952–53, saw relegation to the Second Division. In the final match against Derby County he chose to take a penalty awarded and missed, had he scored Stoke could have stayed up.

Despite this Thomson went on to make over 300 appearances for Stoke in all competitions before new manager Tony Waddington sold him to Middlesbrough in December 1959 for £8,500. He spent two seasons with Boro and ended his career with Hartlepools United.

Personal life
His career was tinged with controversy surrounding his involvement in the 1964 British football match-fixing scandal which saw him jailed for six months. Thomson died of a heart attack in 1969 at the age of 39.

Career statistics

References

External links
 

Scottish footballers
Stoke City F.C. players
Aberdeen F.C. players
Middlesbrough F.C. players
Hartlepool United F.C. players
English Football League players
1930 births
1969 deaths
Footballers from Aberdeen
Scottish Football League players
Banks O' Dee F.C. players
Association football central defenders
Sportspeople convicted of crimes
Sportspeople involved in betting scandals